"Settling Down" is a song co-written and recorded by American country music artist Miranda Lambert. It was released on September 21, 2020, as the third single from Lambert's seventh studio album Wildcard.

Lambert performed the song live at the 54th Annual Country Music Association Awards.

Composition
Lambert wrote the song with Luke Dick and Natalie Hemby, the same team that wrote her previous single, "Bluebird", and it was produced by Jay Joyce. Lambert developed the song's hook while having an earlier conversation with her bus driver about her relationship with Brendan McLoughlin ("am I settling up or settling down?") and brought that to the writing session, and together they wrote a song "full of paradoxes" that highlighted the whirlwind life of an artist touring the country while also desiring the homestead lifestyle following Lambert's fresh marriage to McLoughlin. Lambert also noted that McLoughlin was one of the song's most ardent supporters and lobbied for its release as a single: "And you know, he was out there with us on the road and he was hearing, when I was hanging with radio, that people were responding to it."

Music video
The music video for "Settling Down" was directed by Trey Fanjoy and premiered on October 21, 2020. It was shot on location at Lambert's farm outside Nashville, Tennessee and features her husband, Brendan McLoughlin, marking the first time Lambert has had a love interest in one of her music videos: "I'm like, 'You're cute, you're here, and you're free.' It was fun; he did such a great job... and our little dog is in it, and our ponies. It's at my magical-happy place an hour away from Nashville."

Chart performance
"Settling Down" debuted at number 45 on the Billboard Country Airplay chart dated October 3, 2020, and at number 49 on the Billboard Hot Country Songs chart dated October 17, 2020.

Charts

Weekly charts

Year-end charts

Certifications

References

2019 songs
2020 singles
Miranda Lambert songs
RCA Records Nashville singles
Songs written by Miranda Lambert
Songs written by Luke Dick
Songs written by Natalie Hemby
Song recordings produced by Jay Joyce